Jamides aratus is a butterfly of the lycaenids or blues family. It is found on Peninsular Malaysia, most of Indonesia and some surrounding islands.

Subspecies
 J. a. aratus (Ambon, Serang, Sapania)
 J. a. adana (Druce, 1873) (Peninsular Malaysia, Borneo, Sumatra)
 J. a. pseudaratus (Fruhstorfer, 1916) (Obi)
 J. a. ezeon (Fruhstorfer, 1916) (Banda Island)
 J. a. vuniva Fruhstorfer, 1916 (Halmahera)
 J. a. batjanensis (Röber, 1886) (Bachan)
 J. a. caerulina (Mathew, 1887) (New Britain, Duke of York, possibly Solomons)
 J. a. aetherialis Fruhstorfer, 1916 (Kai Island) May be full species Jamides aetherialis (Butler, 1884)
 J. a. sestus (Fruhstorfer, 1916) (Timor)
 J. a. avrus recte ayrus (Fruhstorfer, 1916) (West Irian) May be subspecies of Jamides aetherialis (Butler, 1884)
 J. a. duvana (Fruhstorfer, 1916) (Karkar Island) May be subspecies of Jamides aetherialis (Butler, 1884)
 J. a. lunata (de Nicéville, 1898) (Sulawesi) 
 J. a. tryphiodorus (Fruhstorfer, 1916) (Java)
 J. a. nausiphanes (Fruhstorfer, 1916) (Palawan)
 J. a. minthe (Fruhstorfer, 1916) (Sula)
 J. a. djampeana (Snellen, 1890) (Tanahjampea)
 J. a. makitai  Takanami, 1987 Talaud
 J. a. vignei Rawlins, Cassidy, Müller, Schröder & Tennent, 2014 (North Maluku, Morotai)
 J. a. roberti Rawlins, Cassidy, Müller, Schröder & Tennent, 2014 (Maluku, Gebe)
 J. a. samueli Rawlins, Cassidy, Müller, Schröder & Tennent, 2014 (Maluku, Damar)

References

Jamides
Butterflies of Indonesia
Butterflies of Malaysia
Butterflies of Borneo
Butterflies described in 1781